The 2012 FIBA Africa Basketball Club Championship (27th edition), is an international basketball tournament  held in Malabo, Equatorial Guinea, from 29 November to 8 December 2012. The tournament, organized by FIBA Africa and hosted by Mongomo, was contested by 12 clubs split into 2 groups of six, the top four of which qualifying for the knock-out stage, quarter-finals, semifinals and final.
 
Primeiro de Agosto from Angola was the winner.

Draw

Squads

Preliminary round
Times given below are in UTC+1.

Group A

Group B

Knockout round

9th–12th place

Quarter-finals

11th place

9th place

5th–8th place

Semifinals

7th place

5th place

Bronze medal game

Gold medal game

Final standings

Primeiro de Agosto rosterAdilson Baza, Agostinho Coelho, Armando Costa, Carlos Almeida, Cedric Isom, Felizardo Ambrósio, Francisco Machado, Hermenegildo Santos, Islando Manuel, Joaquim Gomes, Miguel Lutonda, Reggie Moore, Coach: Paulo Macedo

Statistical Leaders

All Tournament Team

See also 
2013 FIBA Africa Championship

References

External links 
 
 

2012 FIBA Africa Basketball Club Championship
2012 FIBA Africa Basketball Club Championship
Youth